The Catholic University Redemptoris Mater (Spanish: Universidad Católica Redemptoris Mater (UNICA)) is a private university in Managua, Nicaragua. It was founded in 1992 by Cardinal Miguel Obando y Bravo.

UNICA is a member of AUPRICA, the Association of Private Universities of Central America and Panama and ODUCAL, the Organization of Latin American Catholic Universities.

References

Universities in Nicaragua
Educational institutions established in 1992
1992 establishments in Nicaragua